Elmwood Park is a station on Metra's Milwaukee District West Line in Elmwood Park, Illinois. In Metra's zone-based fare system, Elmwood Park is in zone C. As of 2018, Elmwood Park is the 124th busiest of Metra's 236 non-downtown stations, with an average of 388 weekday boardings.

As of December 12, 2022, Elmwood Park is served by 41 trains (20 inbound, 21 outbound) on weekdays, by all 24 trains (12 in each direction) on Saturdays, and by all 18 trains (nine in each direction) on Sundays and holidays.

Elmwood Park station consists of three tracks and two side platforms. The middle track has no platform, so stopping trains must use the outer tracks. Metra's North Central Service trains use the tracks but do not stop. Just west of the station is the Grand Avenue railroad crossing, which is the longest grade crossing in the Chicago area. It is so long and at such an acute angle that drivers need to use extra caution when crossing the tracks. It is used by both Metra and Canadian Pacific Railway trains.

Elmwood Park has built a kiss-and-ride drop off station on Grand Avenue. This allows cars to pull into the driveway and quickly drop off others safely. This is part of their plan to reconstruct Grand Avenue.

Accident

The Grand Avenue railroad crossing just west of the station was the site of a collision on November 23, 2005, between North Central Service train #107 and several cars that were stuck in traffic on the crossing. Nobody was killed, but several people were injured.

Bus connections
Pace

References

External links 

Station from 75th Avenue from Google Maps Street View

Metra stations in Illinois
Former Chicago, Milwaukee, St. Paul and Pacific Railroad stations
Railway stations in Cook County, Illinois
Railway stations in the United States opened in 1916